Chu Ta is a crater on Mercury. It has a diameter of 100 kilometers. Its name was adopted by the International Astronomical Union in 1976. Chu Ta is named for the Chinese painter Zhu Da, who lived from 1625 to 1705.

References

Impact craters on Mercury